Jacques Brel is a Brussels Metro station on the western branch of line 5. It is located in the municipality of Anderlecht, in the western part of Brussels, Belgium. It is named after the Belgian singer, songwriter, and poet Jacques Brel. 

The station opened on 6 October 1982 as part of the Beekkant–Saint Guidon/Sint-Guido extension of former line 1B. Following the reorganisation of the Brussels Metro on 4 April 2009, it is served by line 5. After the City of Brussels commissioned art projects to enhance the metro network, Maurice Wyckaert was appointed to decorate the station.

External links

Brussels metro stations
Jacques Brel
Railway stations opened in 1982
Anderlecht
1982 establishments in Belgium